The Lansing Manor House is a historic home located in North Blenheim, Schoharie County, New York, United States, adjacent to the Blenheim-Gilboa Visitors Center and Mine Kill State Park. It was built in 1819 by John Lansing, Jr. for his daughter and son-in-law, Jacob Livingston Sutherland.  John Lansing, Jr. represented New York as a delegate to the Constitutional Convention in 1787, and the state's Ratification Convention in 1788.

The manor house is a two-story, 46-feet square house with a hipped roof.  It has brick-lined, wood-frame construction on the first floor and wood frame on the second.  It features a five bay, one story porch along the front facade.  Also on the property are: a shed and former summer kitchen, a well and its cover, outhouse, ice house, milk house, barn and silos, a possible guest / tenant house, and several other outbuildings.

The manor house was restored by the New York Power Authority in 1977, and is filled with authentic furnishings from the first half of the 19th century. The property, which is listed in the National Register of Historic Places as a national historic district, is operated by the Power Authority in cooperation with the Schoharie County Historical Society.

Gallery

References

External links

Blenheim-Gilboa Visitors Center, Lansing Manor, Mine Kill State Park
Photo
I Go U Go Visitors Review

Houses on the National Register of Historic Places in New York (state)
Houses completed in 1819
Museums in Schoharie County, New York
Historic house museums in New York (state)
Historic districts on the National Register of Historic Places in New York (state)
Houses in Schoharie County, New York
National Register of Historic Places in Schoharie County, New York